Tanis is a feminine given name. Notable people with the name include:

Tanis (musician) (Tanis Chalopin, born 1993), French-Singaporean singer-songwriter
Tanis Chandler (born 1924), American film actress
Tanis MacDonald, Canadian poet and literature professor
Tanis Rideout, Canadian poet, journalist and novelist 
Tanis S'eiltin (born 1951), American Tlingit artist

See also
James Tanis (born 1965), Papua New Guinean politician
Tanis (disambiguation)

Feminine given names